Salome, Where She Danced is a 1945 American Technicolor Western drama film directed by Charles Lamont and starring Yvonne De Carlo, Rod Cameron, and Walter Slezak. The film follows the adventures of a dancer in 19th-century Europe and the United States. It is loosely based on the story of Lola Montez. Choreography was by Lester Horton.

Plot
The film opens in Virginia in 1865, shortly after General Lee's surrender at Appomattox Court House. A war correspondent, Jim Steed, exchanges comments with Count von Bohlen, an arrogant Prussian army officer serving as a military attaché during the American Civil War. A year later, Steed is in Vienna shortly before the outbreak of the Austro-Prussian War of 1866. There, he encounters a famous dancer, Anna Marie, whom he persuades to spy for him on von Bohlen, now a member of the Prussian general staff, who has become infatuated with her. The secret plans, rhough, which they manage to pass on to the Austrians, are unable to prevent the decisive Prussian victory.

Escaping Vienna just ahead of the conquering Prussian army, they journey to the United States, where they plan to organize a successful career for her in show business.  Stopping in a small western town to stage a show, they choose the exotic Salome for her debut, but it is robbed at gunpoint by local desparados. After Salome is able to recover their money from the bandits, the town elders decide by popular acclaim to rename the settlement "Salome Where She Danced". The bandit leader, Cleve Blunt, an ex-Confederate soldier, develops a romantic interest in Anna Marie and accompanies her on the journey westward.

After moving on to San Francisco, they persuade a wealthy Russian colonel to back her career. Just as she is set to make a success, the arrival of Count von Bohlen seeking revenge leads to a final confrontation.

Cast 
Yvonne De Carlo as Anna Marie
Rod Cameron as Jim Steed
David Bruce as Cleve Blunt
Walter Slezak as Col. Ivan Dimitrioff
Albert Dekker as Count Erik von Bohlen
Marjorie Rambeau as Madam Europe
J. Edward Bromberg as Prof. Max
Abner Biberman as Dr. Ling
John Litel as General Robert E. Lee
Kurt Katch as Count Von Bismarck
Richard Alexander as Shotgun (uncredited) 
Larry Steers as Party Guest (uncredited)

Production
The project had originally been connected to John Ford in 1941, but it was acquired by producer Walter Wanger. He envisaged it as "an Arabian nights story in a Western setting".

The film was loosely based on a short story inspired by the Arizona legend about a town, "Drinkmens Wells", which came to be known as "Salome, Where She Danced". The story was about a Mexican dance-hall performer called "Salome", who danced to hold the attention of a group of outlaws and give the law-abiding members of the town enough time to assemble and arm in protection of their homes. The script expanded the story to incorporate characters such as Robert E. Lee and Bismarck.

Casting
Yvonne de Carlo had been under contract to Paramount Pictures and had been short-listed for important roles in The Story of Dr Wassell and Rainbow Island without actually being given them. She was cast in September 1944. Wanger later said he discovered her by looking at a camera test of another actor in which de Carlo also appeared. Another source says 21 Royal Canadian Air Force bombardier students who loved her as a pinup star campaigned to get her the role. De Carlo later said this was done at her behest; she took several pictures of herself in a revealing costume and got two childhood friends from Vancouver, Reginald Reid and Kenneth Ross McKenzie, who had become pilots, to arrange their friends to lobby on her behalf.

The crew at Universal was set to shoot a wardrobe test for Ava Gardner on a sound stage at Universal. Gardner did not show, and art director Alexander Golitzen ran to producer Walter Wanger's office, asking, "Walter, what the hell is happening?" Wanger replied, "MGM just called, they wouldn't let her go." Yvonne De Carlo was in waiting room with her agent and Golitzen said, "Why don't we test her." Golitzen grabbed De Carlo and raced her to the wardrobe department, and that was it. Golitzen also received an associate production credit for the film.

Shooting
Filming took 64 days at a budget of almost $1.2 million.

Reception
On its release, the film received one of the worst critical receptions of any of Wanger's films. Nonetheless, the film made a profit of $149,387 and launched Yvonne de Carlo as a star.

See also
 Public domain film
 List of American films of 1945
 List of films in the public domain in the United States

References

External links 
 Salome, Where She Danced at IMDB
Review of film at Variety
 

1945 films
1940s historical romance films
1945 romantic drama films
American romantic drama films
Films directed by Charles Lamont
Films set in 1865
Films set in 1866
Films set in Virginia
Films set in Vienna
Films set in Prussia
Films set in San Francisco
Universal Pictures films
Films produced by Walter Wanger
American historical romance films
Films scored by Edward Ward (composer)
1940s English-language films
1940s American films